Yau Tong is an area of Hong Kong, located in the southeastern end of Kowloon, between Lei Yue Mun and Lam Tin, at the east shore of Victoria Harbour, west of Tseung Kwan O. Administratively, it is part of Kwun Tong District, the most densely populated district in Hong Kong.

The northern part of Yau Tong is mainly residential, consisting of public housing, while the sea-facing location in the south is mainly used for industrial development. The southern area has been planned by the government as a private residential area, but there are still sporadic industrial buildings.

Yau Tong is served by the MTR station Yau Tong station. This station is on the eastern end of the Kwun Tong line and the Tseung Kwan O line, and therefore serves as an interchange point for travelling to and from Kowloon and Hong Kong Island.

Etymology 
The name "Yau Tong" literally means "oil pond" in Cantonese. The English transliteration was first recorded in 1924 on a map on Devil's Peak by the government's military department.

In the Hong Kong Annual Report of 1963, two different names were used on two separate maps. The two names were "Ma Yau Tong" and "Yau Tong"; Ma Yau Tong was written on the reclamation bay, while Yau Tong was used on the zoning boundary. However, the text in the book only mentions Yau Tong, saying that the local area is only used for ship repairing and shipbuilding purposes. Because of its near-shore water storage, the government sold land to wood mills. These are special cases of political planning at that time.

The origin of "Ma Yau Tong" is disputed. One possible origin is "", meaning "horse pond", named after a village of the same name on Lam Tin Mountain; However, the two places are not close.

History 
Yau Tong was largely undeveloped before 1940, and was considered a rural or suburban area. In the 1950s, an oil depot was built in Cha Kwo Ling, north of Yau Tong. In the 1960s, Yau Tong was zoned as a public housing estate along the Lei Yue Mun Road by the Hong Kong government. In 1964, a number of public housing estates such as Yau Tong Estate and Ko Chiu Road Estate were built. There was an industrial zone along the coast.

Although Yau Tong is located in Kwun Tong District, it was considered a remote area. When the MTR Kwun Tong line was opened in 1979, a plan to have a station in Yau Tong was not initially implemented. This contributed to the image of Yau Tong as a remote location.

The Eastern Harbour Crossing was opened in 1989, while Yau Tong station itself opened on 4 August 2002, along with the Tseung Kwan O line in which it is included on the same date. The increase of transport and rail links improved the connectivity of Yau Tong with Kowloon, Hong Kong Island, and the rest of Hong Kong.

With the completion of large-scale housing estates and other residences, the area became more integrated with Kowloon and was no longer seen as remote. The increase in population has led to the establishment of several primary and secondary schools in the area, including Fukien Secondary School Affiliated School and Saint Antonius Primary School.

Shopping 
Yau Tong has several shopping centres. Lei Yue Mun Plaza was opened in 2001 on Lei Yue Mun Road. It is located near the MTR station. Subsequently, two more shopping centres have opened. Yau Lai Shopping Centre is connected to Exit B of Yau Tong station and mainly serves residents of Yau Lai Estate.

Lei Yue Mun Plaza

Lei Yue Mun Plaza is a shopping centre in Yau Tong, on the southeastern side of Kwun Tong District, Kowloon, Hong Kong. Its name comes from the nearby Lei Yue Mun channel and the surrounding area in Yau Tong, also called 'Lei Yue Mun'.

At the time of its completion, Lei Yue Mun Plaza was the largest mall by floor space in Yau Tong. Lei Yue Mun Plaza is connected physically to Domain through a series of bridges, allowing visitors to traverse between them easily. The mall is located above exit A1 of Yau Tong station on the Kwun Tong line of the MTR, and is easily accessible from there.

History 
Lei Yue Mun Plaza was developed as part of a masterplan around the development of the fifth phase of Yau Tong Estate. The development of Lei Yue Mun Plaza was managed by the Hong Kong Housing Authority. The shopping centre was originally planned to be developed in two phases. However, the property rights to the first phase were given to the Link Real Estate Investment Trust. The plaza opened in 2001. The Housing Authority retained rights to the second phase of the project, in what would later become Domain.

Disney's Magical Moments, co-produced by the Walt Disney Company (Asia Pacific) Limited and the Hong Kong Housing Authority ran from 21 December 2002 to 5 January 2003. The event was the largest function held by the HKHA to this date, networking 131 of the HKHA's shopping centres. Four shopping malls were decorated with large sets and models that served as stages for Disney characters: Stanley Plaza, Tsz Wan Shan Shopping Centre, Lok Fu Shopping Centre and Lei Yue Mun Plaza.

Design 
The plaza consists of three floors, including the ground floor. The main exhibition venues are located in the 1st floor, above the ground floor. The plaza has a floor area of around 5,600 square meters. A market for fresh food is available on the ground floor.

Bridges on both the first and second floors allow connections to neighbouring Domain. More bridges from the first floor connect to nearby housing estates.

Logo 
The logo for the mall consists of three fish, referencing the fishing industry practiced in Lei Yue Mun, and the names of the shopping centre in Chinese and English.

Tenants
In 2016, 57% of the shops in Lei Yue Mun Plaza were chain stores.

Domain 

Domain, opened on 29 September 2012, is connected to Exit A of Yau Tong station, and is the largest one owned by Hong Kong Housing Authority. It serves about 80,000 people in the area.

Future development 
The Town Planning Board intends to phase out industrial operations and optimize the waterfront for public enjoyment. Several factory buildings in Yau Tong Bay have been demolished.

Residences

Private estates 
 Canaryside
 Spectacle
 Ocean One
 Peninsula East
 One East Coast
 Maya

Home Ownership Scheme 
 Yau Tong Centre
 Ko Chun Court
 Yau Chui Court

Public housing estates 

 Yau Tong Estate
 Yau Mei Court
 Lei Yue Mun Estate
 Yau Lai Estate
 Ko Yee Estate
 Ko Cheung Court

Features
Section 3 of The Wilson Trail begins at Yau Tong near Devil's Peak. It is possible to access the fort on the Peak on foot from the Wilson Trail. The Tseung Kwan O Chinese Permanent Cemetery is reachable from Yau Tong.

Education 
 Hong Kong Taoist Association Chan Lui Chung Tak Memorial School

Yau Tong is in Primary One Admission (POA) School Net 48. Within the school net are multiple aided schools (operated independently but funded with government money) and Kwun Tong Government Primary School.

Transportation

Main road network
Lei Yue Mun Road
Cha Kwo Ling Road
Ko Chiu Road
Eastern Harbour Crossing

Public transport
Yau Tong is served by Yau Tong station on the MTR Kwun Tong line and Tseung Kwan O line, various Kowloon Motor Bus buses as well as red and green mini-buses.

Nearby districts
 Ma Yau Tong
 Kwun Tong District
 Lam Tin
 Lei Yue Mun
 Cha Kwo Ling
 Tiu Keng Leng

See also 
 Junk Bay
 Kowloon
 Kwun Tong District
 Yau Tong station
 Yau Mei Court and Yau Chui Court

References

External links 

 Official Website

 
New Kowloon